Pradeep Yadav is an Indian television director. He is best known for directing series including Balika Vadhu, Pandya Store and Kullfi Kumarr Bajewala.

Career
Yadav started his career as an assistant director. Soon, he directed his first series Grihasti, in 2008. He got his big break with directing the popular series Balika Vadhu from 2008 to 2013. It won him various awards and nominations.

He next directed Kullfi Kumarr Bajewala from 2018 to 2020. From 2021 to 2022, Yadav directed the series Pandya Store and received nominations for his work. He also directed Balika Vadhu 2 from 2021 to 2022.

Filmography

Awards and nominations

References

External links

Living people
Year of birth missing (living people)